Loddon may refer to:
Loddon, Norfolk in England, UK
Shire of Loddon in Victoria, Australia (since 1995)
Bridgewater On Loddon, Victoria in Australia
River Loddon, flows into the River Thames near Reading
Loddon River, flows north from south of Bendigo into the Murray River between Kerang and Swan Hill in Australia

See also
Shire of East Loddon in Victoria (1864-1995)
 London